Shirin Jahan Shanta popularly known as Shanta Jahan is a famous television host, model and actress from Bangladesh. She started her career from 2012 and has more than seven years of experience in anchoring and hosting for Bangladesh's most leading TV channels and live events.

Early life 
Daughter of Late Abdush Satter and Jahanara Begum, Shanta Jahan born on 20 April, 1993 in Dhaka, Bangladesh. She passed her Secondary School Certificate(SSC) from New model bohumukhi High School and Higher Secondary School Certificate(HSC) from Mirpur Bangla College. Shanta Jahan completed her Graduation from Eden Mohila College in Marketing. She is a mother of one son.

Career 
She began her career as a TV host in the year 2012 through a program named "সোনার বাংলা" telecast in Channel 9 (Bangladesh). She never looked back after that time. She hosted many mainstream stage shows both in Bangladesh and in foreign countries. Apart from hosting different TV programs she did more than 30 TV commercials and Press Ads including BSRM, BKash, Standard Chartered and other companies. She also featured with Shakib Al Hasan in a commercial. She is known as BKash girl in town. She was the brand ambassador of RFL. Shanta Jahan also featured in various Government Programs i.e. Ministry of Finance (Bangladesh), Ministry of Textiles and Jute etc. where she played her role as an honorable host. She is a successful model and featured in many mainstream news portals. She started her acting debut in Mabrur Rashid Bannah's serial named Nine & Half. Sources say that she will soon be seen in the films.

Television

Drama

Short film

Awards and nominations

References 

Living people
People from Dhaka
Bangladeshi television actresses
Bangladeshi female models
Bangladeshi actresses
VJs (media personalities)
Bangladeshi television personalities
1993 births
Eden Mohila College alumni